Bisvalles is a corregimiento in La Mesa District, Veraguas Province, Panama with a population of 2,185 as of 2010. Its population as of 1990 was 2,370; its population as of 2000 was 2,147.

References

Corregimientos of Veraguas Province